Ray House may refer to:

in the United States
(by state then city)
Sam Ray House, Clay, Arkansas, listed on the National Register of Historic Places (NRHP) in White County
Ray Apartments Buildings, Denver, Colorado, listed on the NRHP in Downtown Denver
Frank G. Ray House & Carriage House, Vinton, Iowa, listed on the NRHP in Benton County
Stockton-Ray House, Edmonton, Kentucky, listed on the NRHP in Metcalfe County
Ray House (Lancaster, Kentucky), listed on the NRHP in Garrard County
Ray-Wakefield House, Maud, Kentucky, listed on the NRHP in Washington County
Ray Homestead, Opelousas, Louisiana, listed on the NRHP in St. Landry Parish
Bullard-Ray House, Eden, North Carolina, listed on the NRHP in Rockingham County
Clyde H. Ray Sr. House, Waynesville, North Carolina, listed on the NRHP in Haywood County
Ray Opera House, Ray, North Dakota, listed on the NRHP in Williams County
Harold Wass Ray House, Hillsboro, Oregon, listed on the NRHP in Washington County
Childress-Ray House, Murfreesboro, Tennessee, listed on the NRHP in Rutherford County
M. B. Ray House, Waxahachie, Texas, listed on the NRHP in Ellis County
William H. Ray House, Provo, Utah, listed on the NRHP in Utah County
Steedman-Ray House, Washington, D.C., listed on the NRHP in Northwest Quadrant